There are multiple Maple High Schools:

Maple High School (Lompoc, California) in Lompoc, California.
Maple High School (Maple, Ontario), in Maple, Ontario.